"Be the One" is BoA's 12th Japanese solo single. Due to the popularity of the song from her third Japanese album, Love & Honesty, it was released as a special single. Containing only one song, one remix and one instrumental track. The single reached #15 on Oricon Singles Charts. It is featured as a bonus track for the Samurai Warriors 1 Soundtrack.

Track listing
 "Be the One"
 "Be the One" (K-Muto Groovediggerz Remix)
 "Be the One" (Instrumental)

Charts
Oricon Sales Chart (Japan)

BoA songs
2004 songs
Songs written by Steve Kipner
Songs written by Nate Butler
2004 singles
Avex Trax singles
South Korean synth-pop songs
Torch songs
Songs written by David Frank (musician)